Pāvels Švecovs (born 4 September 1994) is a Latvian modern pentathlete. He competed in the men's event at the 2020 Summer Olympics.

References

External links
 

1994 births
Living people
Latvian male modern pentathletes
Modern pentathletes at the 2020 Summer Olympics
Olympic modern pentathletes of Latvia
Place of birth missing (living people)